The declaration of Independence of the Turkish Republic of Northern Cyprus was a unilateral declaration of independence from the Republic of Cyprus by the Turkish Cypriot parliament on 15 November 1983.

Eight years after the Turkish Federated State of Cyprus was proclaimed (in 1975), the declaration of North Cyprus was presented to the Turkish Cypriot parliament in North Nicosia by Turkish Cypriot Leader and Northern Cypriot State President Rauf Denktaş on November 15, 1983. Containing text espousing human rights and a desire to live side-by-side with the Greek Cypriot population, it ended with a declaration that Northern Cyprus was an independent and sovereign state, naming the entity the Turkish Republic of Northern Cyprus. The Turkish Cypriot Parliament passed a unanimous resolution later that day ratifying the declaration.

Background

The declaration

Reactions
The United Nations Security Council issued two resolutions (541 and 550) proclaiming that the Turkish Cypriot UDI was legally invalid and requesting that no other sovereign state should recognise the declaration and asked for its withdrawal.

Recognition

UN Countries and the Others
Turkey formally recognized Northern Cyprus on the day its UDI was declared. The parliament of the Nakhichevan Autonomous Republic, which is a self-governing exclave of Azerbaijan, has issued a resolution recognising the TRNC as a sovereign nation.

The decision of International Court of Justice on the declarations of independences
On 22 July 2010, the United Nations' International Court of Justice non-legally-bindingly decided (in relation to Kosovo) that "International law contains no prohibition on declarations of independence"; see Political status of Kosovo. The ruling was expected to bolster demands for recognition by Northern Cyprus. The decision of UN ICJ was regarded an inspirational way and another option for Turkish Cypriots.

See also
 Federated state

References

1983 in Cyprus
1983 in Northern Cyprus
November 1983 events in Europe
1983 documents
Turkish Republic of Northern Cyprus
Politics of Northern Cyprus
Secession in Cyprus
Cyprus dispute
Law of Northern Cyprus
Turkish nationalism in Cyprus